This is a list of Spanish television related events from 1965.

Events
7 February - Conchita Bautista is selected to represent Spain at the 1965 Eurovision Song Contest with her song "¡Qué bueno, qué bueno!". She is selected to be the fifth Spanish Eurovision entry during Eurofestival held at TVE Studios in Barcelona.
 22 February: TVE broadcasts and adaptation of The Crucible by Arthur Miller, directed by Pedro Amalio López, and starred by Gemma Cuervo, Lola Gaos and Irene Gutiérrez Caba becoming a masterpiece in Life Theatre on Spanish TV.
 6 October: Estudio 1, the most iconic Theatre show on Soanish TV, debuts on TVE.

Debuts

La 1

Television shows

Ending this year

Foreign series debuts in Spain

La 1

Births
 1 January - Silvia Gambino, actress.
 14 January - Toni Cantó, actor.
 24 January - Andreu Buenafuente, host.
 16 March - Belén Rueda, actress and hostess.
 18 March - María José Sáez Carrasco, journalist
 1 April - Jose Toledo, hostess.
 4 April - Sergio Pazos, host.
 6 April - Andoni Ferreño, host and actor.
 11 April - Jesús Calleja, host.
 6 June - Soledad Mallol, actress and comedian.
 14 June - Paco Lodeiro, host.
 20 June - Remedios Cervantes, actress and hostess.
 27 June - Juan José Artero, actor.
 28 June - Teté Delgado, actress.
 30 June - José Mota, comedian.
 26 July - Ana García-Siñeriz, hostess.
 28 July - Mariló Montero, hostess.
 4 August - Neus Asensi, actress.
 31 August - Pablo Motos, host.
 31 August - Terelu Campos, hostess.
 7 September - Antonio Lobato, journalist sport.
 9 September - Jesús Vázquez, host.
 23 September - Diana Peñalver, actress.
 28 September - Susana Roza, hostess.
 29 September - Boris Izaguirre, host.
 5 October - José Couso, cameraman.
 31 October - Mario Zorrilla, actor.
 1 November - Gemma Nierga, journalist.
 11 November - Juan Antonio Muñoz, comedian.
 14 December - José Corbacho, host, actor and comedian.
 16 December - Elsa Anka, hostess.
 27 December  - Gustavo González, journalist.
 Santiago Urrialde, comedian.
 Yolanda Arestegui, actress.

See also
1965 in Spain
List of Spanish films of 1965

References